Ervin Amedo Sotto (born July 30, 1981) is a Filipino former professional basketball player. He was also an assistant coach for the NLEX Road Warriors. He was the seventh overall pick in the 2004 PBA draft by the Purefoods Tender Juicy Hotdogs. He also played for the Shell Turbo Chargers, Barangay Ginebra Kings and the Air21 Express, Alaska Aces before joining NLEX Road Warriors camp. Sotto was one of the most promising big men and was known for his good shooting from outside the arc. He was included in one of the most controversial trades in the PBA involving Rudy Hatfield, Billy Mamaril, Rafi Reavis, and Aries Dimaunahan.

Professional career
Before the 2004 PBA draft, Sotto played for Saint Francis of Assisi College System along with his twin tower center-forward Ranidel de Ocampo to which they grab championships in a collegiate league NCRAA. Sotto was a highly heralded prospect mainly because of his size and was projected by some to be the first pick of that year's draft. Eventually, he was picked seventh overall by Purefoods Tender Juicy Giants. Coming out of the Philippine Basketball League he was once acquired the Most Improved Player and Mythical Five selection from a well known team Welcoat Housepaint.

In 2005, Sotto was traded to Shell Turbo Chargers for Mike Hrabak. In December 2005, his contract with Shell expired and was not renewed, making him a free agent.

In December 2005, Barangay Ginebra Kings signed him after his contract with Sta. Lucia expired.

In July 2006, Sotto was traded by Barangay Ginebra to Air21 Express in a controversial three-team trade that also involved Coca-Cola Tigers. In the end of the 2007–08 PBA season, Sotto was released by the Express.

In September 2008, just after he was released by Air21, the Alaska Aces picked him up.

On 2012, Sotto was signed by the Petron Blaze Boosters. However, after just four games with the team, he was released.

In March 2016, Sotto was signed by Byaheng SCTEX of the Pilipinas Commercial Basketball League.

National team career
Sotto represented the Philippines national basketball team at the 2003 Southeast Asian Games in Vietnam where he won the gold medal.

Personal life
Sotto is married to Pamela Sotto (née Perlado) and has three children, including his eldest son, Kai, who last played for the Adelaide 36ers of the Australian National Basketball League.

PBA career statistics

Season-by-season averages

|-
| align=left | 
| align=left | Shell
| 33 || 6.7 || .299 || .211 || .625 || 1.3 || .2 || .1 || .2 || 1.7
|-
| align=left | 
| align=left | Purefoods / Barangay Ginebra
| 33 || 8.1 || .448 || .000 || .697 || 1.8 || .2 || .0 || .4 || 3.3
|-
| align=left | 
| align=left | Air21
| 29 || 7.6 || .426 || .000 || .722 || 1.9 || .5 || .1 || .1 || 2.2
|-
| align=left | 
| align=left | Air21
| 42 || 6.9 || .390 || .231 || .600 || 1.2 || .2 || .0 || .1 || 1.6
|-
| align=left | 
| align=left | Alaska
| 13 || 5.3 || .562 || .000 || 1.000 || 1.1 || .1 || .0 || .0 || 1.5
|-
| align=left | 
| align=left | Alaska
| 2 || 2.0 || 1.000 || .000 || .500 || 1.0 || .0 || .0 || .0 || 3.0
|-
| align=left | 
| align=left | Petron Blaze
| 4 || 3.5 || .571 || .000 || .000 || 1.0 || .0 || .0 || .3 || 2.0
|- class=sortbottom
| align=center colspan=2 | Career
| 156 || 7.0 || .408 || .189 || .681 || 1.5 || .2 || .0 || .2 || 2.1

References

1981 births
Living people
Alaska Aces (PBA) players
Barako Bull Energy players
Barangay Ginebra San Miguel players
Basketball players from Metro Manila
Centers (basketball)
People from Las Piñas
Philippines men's national basketball team players
Filipino men's basketball players
San Miguel Beermen players
Shell Turbo Chargers players
Magnolia Hotshots players
Southeast Asian Games gold medalists for the Philippines
Southeast Asian Games medalists in basketball
Filipino men's basketball coaches
NLEX Road Warriors coaches
Competitors at the 2003 Southeast Asian Games
St. Francis Doves basketball players
Members of Iglesia ni Cristo